O. S. Manian is a member of the 15th Tamil Nadu Legislative Assembly from Vedaranyam constituency. He is a staunch loyalist to AIADMK Supremo J Jayalalithaa. He previously represented the Mayiladuturai (Lok Sabha constituency) of Tamil Nadu and is a member of the All India Anna Dravida Munnetra Kazhagam political party.

J Jayalalithaa appointed Manian as Minister for Handlooms and Textiles in May 2016. This was his first cabinet post in the Government of Tamil Nadu.

Education and background
Manian has completed formal education only till XII standard. An agriculturist by profession, he has held various offices since 1995.
OS Manian belongs to Agamudayar and currently the district Secretary of Aiadmk Nagapatinam.

Posts held

References 

India MPs 2009–2014
Lok Sabha members from Tamil Nadu
1954 births
Living people
All India Anna Dravida Munnetra Kazhagam politicians
Rajya Sabha members from Tamil Nadu
Tamil Nadu MLAs 2016–2021
State cabinet ministers of Tamil Nadu
People from Nagapattinam district
Tamil Nadu MLAs 2021–2026